Masahide Kudo (工藤政英, born 24 May 1991) is a retired Japanese kickboxer who competed in the featherweight division of RISE, where he was champion. A professional competitor since 2013, he was also a former REBELS Super Bantamweight champion.

As of August 2021, he was the #4 ranked Super Flyweight in the world, according to Combat Press.

Kickboxing career

Early career
Kudo made his professional debut against Takuya Fujii at Kikken IX Part.2 on February 17, 2013. He won the fight by a second-round technical knockout. He would go on to amass a 3–3 record over the course of his first year as a professional fighter.

Kudo was scheduled to face Shunta Aragaki at REBELS.23 on January 26, 2014. He won the fight by a third-round technical knockout, beginning a seven-fight winning streak that would culminate in a REBELS title fight.

REBELS Super Bantamweight champion

Super Bantamweight tournament
Kudo participated in the REBELS super bantamweight tournament, held to determine the new champion. He was scheduled to face the DEEP KICK 55kg champion Masahiko Suzuki in the semifinals at REBELS.33 on January 25, 2015. Kudo won the fight by split decision, after an extra round was fought. Kudo faced Takeo Oode in the tournament final, held at REBELS.36 on May 10, 2015. He won the bout by unanimous decision, with scores of 49–48, 49–47 and 50–45.

Title reign
Kudo was scheduled to face Taiki Naito in the quarterfinals of the BLADE FC 2 Japan Cup, on August 1, 2015. He lost to the eventual finalist by a first-round knockout.

Kudo was scheduled to make his first title defense against Shuto Miyazaki at Rebels.42 on April 3, 2016. He won the fight by a third-round technical knockout, through repeated body shots.

Kudo made his RISE debut against Yugo Tsuboi at Rise 111 on May 29, 2016. He won the fight by a first-round technical knockout.

Kudo was scheduled to face Keisuke Miyamoto at REBELS.45 in the Kunlun Fight and REBELS cross-promotional event. The fight was ruled a majority draw, with of the three judges scoring the bout 29–28 for Miyamoto.

Kudo was scheduled to make his last appearance with REBELS against Eisaku Ogasawara at REBELS.46 on October 23, 2016. Kudo lost by a first-round knockout.

RISE
Kudo was scheduled to face the #5 ranked RISE featherweight Takanobu Sano at Rise 116 on March 5, 2017. Kudo knocked Sano down twice in the second round of the bout, first time with a left hook, while the second was from a combination of punches. The referee stopped the bout after the second knockdown, as Sano was unable to continue.

Kudo was scheduled to face the #3 ranked RISE featherweight Yoshihisa Morimoto at Rise 117 on May 20, 2017. The fight was ruled a majority draw after the first three rounds were fought, with one of the three judges scoring the fight 29–28 for Morimoto. The bout was ruled a unanimous decision draw after an extra round was fought, with all three judges scoring it an even 10–10.

Kudo was scheduled to face the #1 ranked RISE featherweight Yuta Murakoshi at Rise 118 on July 17, 2017. Murakoshi won the fight by majority decision, with scores of 30–30, 30–28 and 30–28.

2017 Dead or Alive Tournament
Kudo participated in the 2017 RISE Dead or Alive tournament, held at Rise 121 on November 23, 2017, with a ¥2 million prize for the tournament winner. Kudo was scheduled to face Ken Flyskygym in the tournament quarterfinal. He won the fight by a first-round technical knockout, needing a little less than 90 seconds to knock Ken down twice. Kudo advanced to the semifinals, where he faced the tournament favorite Taiki Naito. Kudo lost to the eventual tournament winner by unanimous decision, with scores of 30–28, 30–27 and 30–27.

RISE Featherweight champion

RISE featherweight tournament
Kudo took part in a four-man tournament, organized to crown the new featherweight champion. He was scheduled to face Tatsuki Shinotsuka in what was Shinotsuka's second professional appearance. The second semifinal pairing was contested by the #6 ranked RISE featherweight Shuto Miyazaki and the #1 ranked Yoshihisa Morimoto. Kudo won the semifinal bout by a second-round technical knockout, scoring all three knockdowns through repeated low kicks. Kudo fought a rematch with Yoshihisa Morimoto in the tournament finals, held at Rise 125 on June 17, 2018. He won the fight by unanimous decision.

Title reign
Kudo was scheduled to face Shiro at Rise 129 on November 17, 2018. Shiro won the fight by unanimous decision, with all three judges scoring the bout 30–29 in his favor.

Kudo made his ONE Championship debut against the former Lumpinee Stadium bantamweight champion Petchdam Petchyindee Academy at ONE Championship: Call to Greatness on February 22, 2019. He lost the fight by a second-round knockout.

Kudo was scheduled to face Tarik Totts at RISE 132 on May 19, 2019. He won the fight by a second-round body kick knockout.

Kudo was scheduled to face Thalisson Gomes Ferreira at RISE WORLD SERIES 2019 Semi-Final Round in OSAKA on July 21, 2019. He won the fight by majority decision, with scores of 29–28, 28–28 and 29–28.

Kudo made his second ONE Championship appearance against Panpayak Jitmuangnon at ONE Championship: Immortal Triumph on September 6, 2019. He lost the fight by unanimous decision.

Kudo was scheduled to face Ryo Takahashi at Rise 145 on July 19, 2020. The fight was ruled a majority draw after the first three rounds were contested, with one of the judges giving Kudo a 30–29 scorecard. The fight was once again ruled a majority draw after an extra round was fought.

Kudo was scheduled to fight the WBC Muaythai Japan featherweight champion Takuma Ota at Rise 145 on January 30, 2021. He won the fight by unanimous decision, with all three judges scoring the bout 30–28 in his favor.

Kudo was scheduled to face Kanta Tabuchi at Rise 148 on April 17, 2021. He won the fight by unanimous decision.

Kudo was scheduled to make his first RISE featherweight title defense against the #1 ranked featherweight contender Masaki Takeuchi at Rise 151 on July 28, 2021. It was Kudo's first title fight since winning the championship on June 17, 2018. Kudo won the fight by a first-round technical knockout, successfully knocking Takeuchi down three times in less than two minutes.

On December 11, 2021 Kudo announced his retirement after suffering a nose injury deemed inoperable.

Championships and accomplishments
RISE
RISE Featherweight Championship (One successful title defense)
REBELS
REBELS Super Bantamweight championship  (One successful title defense)

Fight record

|-  style="text-align:center; background:#cfc;"
| 2021-07-28 || Win ||align=left| Masaki Takeuchi || Rise 151 || Bunkyo, Tokyo, Japan || TKO (3 Knockdowns/Punches) || 1 ||  1:43
|-
! style=background:white colspan=9 |

|-  style="text-align:center; background:#cfc;"
| 2021-04-17 || Win ||align=left| Kanta Tabuchi || Rise 148 || Bunkyo, Tokyo, Japan || Decision (Unanimous) || 3 || 3:00

|-  style="text-align:center; background:#cfc;"
| 2021-01-30 || Win ||align=left| Takuma Ota || Rise 145 || Bunkyo, Tokyo, Japan || Decision (Unanimous) || 3 || 3:00

|-  style="text-align:center; background:#c5d2ea;"
| 2020-07-19 || Draw ||align=left| Ryo Takahashi || Rise 145 || Bunkyo, Tokyo, Japan || Ext. R. Decision (Split) || 4 || 3:00

|-  style="text-align:center; background:#fbb;"
| 2019-09-06 || Loss||align=left| Panpayak Jitmuangnon || ONE Championship: Immortal Triumph || Kallang, Singapore || Decision (Unanimous) || 3 || 3:00

|-  style="text-align:center; background:#cfc;"
| 2019-07-21 || Win ||align=left| Thalisson Gomes Ferreira || RISE WORLD SERIES 2019 Semi-Final Round in OSAKA || Osaka, Japan || Decision (Majority) || 3 || 3:00

|-  style="text-align:center; background:#cfc;"
| 2019-05-19 || Win ||align=left| Tarik Totts || RISE 132 || Tokyo, Japan || KO (Right body kick) || 2 || 2:32

|-  style="text-align:center; background:#fbb;"
| 2019-02-22 || Loss||align=left| Petchdam Petchyindee Academy || ONE Championship: Call to Greatness || Kallang, Singapore || KO (Punch) || 2 || 0:35

|-  style="text-align:center; background:#fbb;"
| 2018-11-17 || Loss||align=left| Shiro || Rise 129 || Tokyo, Japan || Decision (Unanimous) || 3 || 3:00

|-  style="text-align:center; background:#cfc;"
| 2018-06-17 || Win ||align=left| Yoshihisa Morimoto || Rise 125, Tournament Final || Chiba, Japan || Decision (Unanimous) || 5 || 3:00
|-
! style=background:white colspan=9 |

|-  style="text-align:center; background:#cfc;"
| 2018-03-24 || Win ||align=left| Tatsuki Shinotsuka || Rise 123, Tournament Semifinal || Tokyo, Japan || TKO (Three knockdown rule) || 2 || 1:34

|-  style="text-align:center; background:#fbb;"
| 2017-11-23 || Loss ||align=left| Taiki Naito || Rise 121, Tournament Semifinal || Tokyo, Japan || Decision (Unanimous) || 3 || 3:00

|-  style="text-align:center; background:#cfc;"
| 2017-11-23 || Win ||align=left| Ken Flyskygym || Rise 121, Tournament Quarterfinal || Tokyo, Japan || TKO (Two knockdown rule) || 1 || 1:27

|-  style="text-align:center; background:#fbb;"
| 2017-07-17 || Loss ||align=left| Yuta Murakoshi || Rise 118 || Bunkyo, Tokyo, Japan || Decision (Majority) || 3 || 3:00

|-  style="text-align:center; background:#c5d2ea;"
| 2017-05-20 || Loss ||align=left| Yoshihisa Morimoto || Rise 117 || Bunkyo, Tokyo, Japan || Ext. R. Decision (Unanimous) || 4 || 3:00

|-  style="text-align:center; background:#cfc;"
| 2017-03-05 || Win ||align=left| Takanobu Sano || Rise 116 || Bunkyo, Tokyo, Japan || TKO (Punches) || 2 || 2:43

|-  style="text-align:center; background:#fbb;"
| 2016-10-23 || Loss ||align=left| Eisaku Ogasawara || REBELS.46 || Tokyo, Japan || KO (Right hook) || 1 || 0:43
|-

|-  style="text-align:center; background:#c5d2ea;"
| 2016-08-07 || Draw ||align=left| Keisuke Miyamoto || KUNLUN FIGHT 49×REBELS.45 || Tokyo, Japan || Decision (Majority) || 3 || 3:00
|-

|-  style="text-align:center; background:#cfc;"
| 2016-05-29|| Win ||align=left| Yugo Tsuboi || Rise 111 || Bunkyo, Tokyo, Japan || TKO (Punches) || 1 || 2:39

|-  style="text-align:center; background:#cfc;"
| 2016-04-03 || Win ||align=left| Shuto Miyazaki || Rebels.42 || Tokyo, Japan || TKO (Body shots) || 3 || 0:55
|-
! style=background:white colspan=9 |

|-  style="text-align:center; background:#c5d2ea;"
| 2016-01-24 || Draw ||align=left| Yuta "Cat" Hamamoto || Rebels.40 || Tokyo, Japan || Decision (Majority) || 3 || 3:00

|-  style="text-align:center; background:#fbb;"
| 2015-08-01 || Loss ||align=left| Taiki Naito || BLADE FIGHTING CHAMPIONSHIP 2 JAPAN CUP −55 kg, Quarter Finals || Ota, Tokyo, Japan || KO (Right hook) || 1 || 1:53

|-  style="text-align:center; background:#cfc;"
| 2015-05-10 || Win ||align=left| Takeo Oode || REBELS.36, Tournament Final || Tokyo, Japan || Decision (Unanimous) || 5 || 3:00
|-
! style=background:white colspan=9 |

|-  style="text-align:center; background:#cfc;"
| 2015-01-25 || Win ||align=left| Masahiko Suzuki || REBELS.33, Tournament Semifinal || Tokyo, Japan || Ext.R Decision (Split) || 4 || 3:00

|-  style="text-align:center; background:#cfc;"
| 2014-12-23 || Win ||align=left| Yusuke Deguchi || REBELS.32 || Tokyo, Japan || KO (Right hook) || 2 || 2:13

|-  style="text-align:center; background:#cfc;"
| 2014-10-26 || Win ||align=left| Nobuhita Shiraoka || REBELS.31 || Tokyo, Japan || KO (Left hook) || 2 || 0:30

|-  style="text-align:center; background:#cfc;"
| 2014-07-27 || Win ||align=left| Masahito Sato || J-NETWORK J-FIGHT in SHINJUKU～vol.38～ || Tokyo, Japan || Decision (Unanimous) || 3 || 3:00

|-  style="text-align:center; background:#cfc;"
| 2014-04-20 || Win ||align=left| Atsushi Tateshima || REBELS.26 ～the duel～ || Tokyo, Japan || KO || 1 || 1:36

|-  style="text-align:center; background:#cfc;"
| 2014-03-16 || Win ||align=left| KO-HEI || REBELS.25 a.k.a. INNOVATION's day || Tokyo, Japan || KO || 2 || 2:15

|-  style="text-align:center; background:#cfc;"
| 2014-01-26 || Win ||align=left| Shunta Aragaki || REBELS.23 || Tokyo, Japan || KO || 3 || 1:22

|-  style="text-align:center; background:#fbb;"
| 2013-10-14 || Loss ||align=left| Ryoma Hasumi || M-FIGHT～Shuken 13～Part.1 || Tokyo, Japan || KO || 1 || 0:47

|-  style="text-align:center; background:#fbb;"
| 2013-09-01 || Loss ||align=left| Hiro P.K. Saenchai Muaythaigym || M-FIGHT～Shuken XII×Legend of Daddy 3 || Tokyo, Japan || Decision (Split) || 3 || 3:00

|-  style="text-align:center; background:#cfc;"
| 2013-07-21 || Win ||align=left| Kengo Asano || M-FIGHT Muaylok 2013 -2nd- || Tokyo, Japan || KO || 1 || 2:49

|-  style="text-align:center; background:#cfc;"
| 2013-06-09|| Win ||align=left| Yukinori Ogasawara || TNK1 feat.REBELS || Gunma, Japan || KO || 1 || 2:49

|-  style="text-align:center; background:#fbb;"
| 2013-04-28 || Loss ||align=left| Hiro P.K. Saenchai Muaythaigym || Muay Lok 2013 1st || Tokyo, Japan || Decision (Unanimous) || 1 || 1:53

|-  style="text-align:center; background:#cfc;"
| 2013-02-17 || Win ||align=left| Takuya Fujii || Kikken IX Part.2 || Tokyo, Japan || TKO (Punches) || 2 || 1:09

|-
| colspan=9 | Legend:

See also
 List of male kickboxers

References

Japanese kickboxers
1991 births
Living people
Japanese male kickboxers
ONE Championship kickboxers
People from Takasaki, Gunma
Sportspeople from Gunma Prefecture